Moacir Barbosa do Nascimento (27 March 1921 – 7 April 2000) was a Brazilian professional footballer who played as a goalkeeper. His career spanned 22 years. He was regarded as one of the world's best goalkeepers in the 1940s and 1950s, and was known for not wearing gloves, as would be typical. Barbosa is mainly associated with Brazil's defeat against underdogs Uruguay in the decisive match of the 1950 FIFA World Cup, an upset dubbed the Maracanazo.

Club career

Success with Vasco da Gama

At club level, Barbosa had his greatest successes with Rio de Janeiro side CR Vasco da Gama. He won several trophies at Vasco, including the Campeonato Sul-Americano de Campeões in 1948, the original precursor to the Copa Libertadores.

International career

1949 Copa América

With the Brazilian national side, Barbosa won the 1949 Copa América. The 7–0 final victory over Paraguay remains to date the highest victory in a final of the competition.

The 1950 Maracanazo match and its aftermath

In the 1950 FIFA World Cup held on home soil, Brazil played Uruguay in the decisive match of the World Cup finals at the Maracanã stadium in Rio de Janeiro. Brazil was heavily favoured to win, and needed only a draw to win the round-robin tournament, but despite scoring first, Brazil lost 2–1 when Alcides Ghiggia scored the winning goal for Uruguay in the 79th minute after skilfully dribbling past Brazilian defender Bigode and then drilling the ball into the net while Barbosa was out of position, expecting a cross into the middle of the pitch. The loss stunned Brazilians and plunged the country into mourning, over what became known as the Maracanazo, or "the Maracanã blow."

Barbosa was blamed for the defeat, for which he suffered for the rest of his life as the match became part of Brazilian folklore. In 2000, shortly before his death, he said in an interview: "The maximum punishment in Brazil is 30 years' imprisonment, but I have been paying, for something I am not even responsible for, by now, for 50 years." In 1993, the president of the Brazilian Football Confederation, Ricardo Teixeira, did not allow him to be commentator during the broadcast of one of Brazil's international matches.

In 1963, Barbosa was presented with the old square wooden goalposts from the Maracanã as a present, which he took home and burned.

On 7 April 2000, he died of a heart attack at the age of 79.

In popular culture
Barbosa plays a large role in Ian McDonald's science fiction novel Brasyl. Also, he is the main subject of the novel The Last Save of Moacyr Barbosa, by Darwin Pastorin.

A Brazilian short film named Barbosa, premiered in 1988. In it, a 49-year-old man (played by Antônio Fagundes) travels back in time trying to avoid Ghiggia's goal.

Honours

Club
Vasco da Gama
Campeonato Sul-Americano de Campeões: 1948
Torneio Rio-São Paulo: 1958
Campeonato Carioca: 1945, 1947, 1949, 1950, 1952, 1958                                                                                           
Torneio Intercontinental Octogonal Rivadavia Correa Meyer: 1953,A terceira edição copa rio

International
Brazil
Copa América: 1949

Unofficial tournaments

International
Brazil
Copa Roca (unoff.)¹: 1945
Copa Rio Branco (unoff.)²: 1947, 1950

¹) irregular friendly tournament between Brazil and Argentina
²) irregular friendly tournament between Brazil and Uruguay

Club
Torneio Quadrangular do Rio (inoff.)¹: 1953
Torneio Internacional de Santiago de Chile (inoff.)²: 1953

¹) with CR Vasco da Gama, CR Flamengo (both R.d Janeiro), CA Boca Juniors and. Racing Club (both Argentina)
²) with CR Vasco da Gama, Millonarios (Bogotá) and CSD Colo-Colo (Santiago)

Individual

IFFHS Brazilian Keeper of the 20th Century: (3rd place)
IFFHS South American Keeper of the 20th Century: (11th place)

References

External links
El Mundo (Spain) – Obituary
Casa do Cinema de Porto Alegre – Barbosa the film

Books
 Darwin Pastorin, L'ultima parata di Moacyr Barbosa (The Last Save of Moacyr Barbosa) Arnoldo Mondadori Editore, 2005 (Published in Italy) 
Alex Bellos, Futebol: The Brazilian Way of Life, Bloomsbury, 2002 

1921 births
2000 deaths
Brazilian footballers
Association football goalkeepers
1950 FIFA World Cup players
CR Vasco da Gama players
Santa Cruz Futebol Clube players
Sportspeople from Campinas
Brazil international footballers